The  Jim Crow persona is a theater character — developed and popularized by Thomas D. Rice (1808–1860) — and a racist depiction of African-Americans and of their culture. Rice based the character on a folk trickster named Jim Crow that had long been popular among black slaves. Rice also adapted and popularized a traditional  slave song called "Jump Jim Crow" (1828).

The character conventionally dresses in rags and wears a battered hat and torn shoes. Rice applied blackface makeup made of burnt cork to his face and hands and impersonated a very nimble and irreverently witty African-American field-hand who sang, "Come listen all you galls and boys, I'm going to sing a little song, my name is Jim Crow, weel about and turn about and do jis so, eb'ry time I weel about I jump Jim Crow."

Origin
The actual origin of the Jim Crow character has been lost to legend. One story claims it is Rice's emulation of a black slave that he had seen on his travels throughout the Southern United States, whose owner was one Mr. Crow. Several sources describe Rice encountering an elderly black stableman working in one of the river towns where Rice was performing. According to some accounts, the man had a crooked leg and a deformed shoulder. He was singing about Jim Crow and punctuating each stanza with a little jump. According to Edmon S. Conner, an actor who worked with Rice early in his career, the alleged encounter happened in Louisville, Kentucky. Conner and Rice were both engaged for a summer season at the city theater, which at the back overlooked a livery stable. An elderly and deformed slave working in the stable yard often performed a song and dance he had improvised for his own amusement. The actors saw him, and Rice "watched him closely, and saw that there was a character unknown to the stage.  He wrote several verses, changed the air somewhat, quickened it a good deal, made up exactly like Daddy, and sang it to a Louisville audience. They were wild with delight..." According to Conner, the livery stable was owned by a white man named Crow, whose name the elderly slave adopted.

A more likely explanation behind the origin of the character is that Rice had observed and absorbed African American traditional song and dance over many years. He grew up in a racially integrated Manhattan neighborhood, and later Rice toured the Southern slave states. According to the reminiscences of Isaac Odell, a former minstrel who described the development of the genre in an interview given in 1907, Rice appeared on stage at Louisville, Kentucky, in the 1830s and learned there to mimic local black speech: "Coming to New York he opened up at the old Park Theatre, where he introduced his Jim Crow act, impersonating a black slave.  He sang a song, 'I Turn About and Wheel About', and each night composed new verses for it, catching on with the public and making a great name for himself."

Jim Crow laws

Rice's famous stage persona eventually lent its name to a generalized negative and stereotypical view of black people.  The shows peaked in the 1850s, and after Rice's death in 1860 interest in them faded. There was still some memory of them in the 1870s however, just as the "Jim Crow" segregation laws were surfacing in the United States. The Jim Crow period was later revived by President Woodrow Wilson: after he saw a showing of the motion picture The Birth of a Nation, which glorified the Ku Klux Klan and portrayed black people as rapists and animals, in the first-ever movie viewing in the White House, he signed segregation laws that first targeted black people in government. Ida B. Wells, a well known black Republican journalist and a co-founder of the NAACP, bitterly fought against this policy. In the 1960s, when the struggle for civil rights in the United States gained national attention, President Lyndon Johnson signed the Civil Rights Act.

Legacy 

The poem "The Jackdaw of Rheims" by Richard Barham, published in 1837 (and in The Ingoldsby Legends of 1840), concludes "It's the custom, at Rome, new names to bestow, So they canonized him by the name of Jim Crow!".          

By 1838, and through to the end of the 19th century, the term "Jim Crow" was used as an offensive term towards black people, well before it became associated with Jim Crow laws. 

The "Jim Crow" character as portrayed by Rice popularized the perception of African-Americans as lazy, untrustworthy, dumb, and unworthy of integration. Rice's performances helped to popularize American minstrelsy, in which many performers imitated Rice's use of blackface and stereotypical depiction, touring around the United States. Those performers continued to spread the racist overtones and ideas manifested by the character to populations across the United States, contributing to white Americans developing a negative view of African-Americans in both their character and their work ethic.

In Nathaniel Hawthorne's The House of the Seven Gables (1851), a young schoolboy buys two gingerbread "Jim Crow" cookies for a penny apiece.

Another character with the name Jim Crow was featured in the 1941 Walt Disney's animated feature film Dumbo portrayed as a literal crow, although his name is never mentioned in the film. The character, originally named "Jim Crow" on the original model sheets, was renamed in the 1950s "Dandy Crow" in attempt to avoid controversy. Floyd Norman, the first African-American animator hired at Walt Disney Productions during the 1950s, explained that the reason for the name 'Jim Crow' was "taking a cartoony jab at the oppressive Jim Crow laws in the South" in an article entitled Black Crows and Other PC Nonsense.

In the music video for Childish Gambino's "This Is America", Gambino shoots a man in the back of the head while posing like a Jim Crow caricature.

See also
Eldred Kurtz Means

References

Crow, Jim
Crow, Jim
Crow, Jim
Crow, Jim
Anti-African and anti-black slurs
Stereotypes of African Americans
Jim Crow
American culture
American slang